John X may refer to:

Pope John X (r. 914–928)
John X (archbishop of Ravenna) (r. 983–998)
John X bar Shushan (r. 1063/1064–1072/1073)
Pope John X of Alexandria (r. 1363–1369)
John X of Antioch (Greek Orthodox, r. 2013–present)